Nothocalais troximoides is a species of flowering plant in the family Asteraceae known by the common name sagebrush false dandelion. It is native to western North America, including British Columbia and the northwestern United States.

Description
The leaves are located around the base of the stem and often have crinkled wavy edges, and sometimes a thin coat of small hairs. The inflorescence is a flower head lined with green, sometimes purple-speckled, phyllaries and containing many yellow ray florets and no disc florets.

Range and Habitat
Nothocalais troximoides is native to British Columbia and the northwestern United States in Washington, Oregon, northern California, Idaho, and Montana. It grows in sagebrush and other plateau and mountain habitat types.

Gallery

References

External links

 Jepson Manual Treatment
 USDA Plants Profile
 
 

troximoides